One60 Elgin (stylized as ONE60 Elgin),  formerly  Place Bell, is an office tower in Ottawa, Ontario, Canada. The 27-storey building stands on Elgin Street in downtown Ottawa, and is distinguishable by its wide stature (the building is unusually large in dimensions considering its height, presumably to avoid having a 50+ storey building greatly overshadow the Peace Tower).

The building was built by Olympia and York in 1971 as the Ottawa headquarters of Bell Canada. The site originally contained a number of small commercial buildings and the large Gloucester Street Convent. Original plans called for the complex to be much larger and include the entire block to the north. This would have entailed demolishing several heritage buildings, including the First Baptist Church.

The main level contains a shopping concourse with a number of businesses. The rear of the structure contains a parking garage. In the 1980s the owners sued the city after salt placed on the roads by the city corroded the steel structure of the garage and it had to be closed for several years.

Bell, which remains the building's largest tenant, owned the building until 1998, when it was sold to TrizecHahn for $17 million. After the purchase, TrizecHahn conducted significant renovations. In 2002 it was bought by H&R Real Estate Investment Trust for $21.1 million.

The building underwent extensive renovations from 2015 to 2017 afterwhich it was renamed One60 Elgin. In 2019, beehives were installed on the building's roof in order to combat declining honey bee populations.

One60 Elgin is breifly featured in the opening title sequence of the Ottawa-made TV series You Can't Do That On Television as a building labelled "Television Network", where a school bus pulls up to the front door and a number of children flood out and into the building, trampling the doorman (played by Les Lye).

See also
List of tallest buildings in Ottawa-Gatineau

References
Exploring Ottawa: an architectural guide to the nation's capital. Harold Kalman and John Roaf. Toronto: University of Toronto Press, 1983.

External links

Buildings and structures in Ottawa
Modernist architecture in Canada